Yann Chaussinand (born 11 May 1998 in Clermont-Ferrand) is a French hammer thrower.

He won the 2018 Mediterranean Athletics U23 Championships. His personal best is of 74.59 m at Stade d'honneur Marcel-Roustan, Salon-de-Provence (FRA), on 21 February 2021.

References

External links

Living people
1998 births
French male hammer throwers
French Athletics Championships winners